Tyler Reif (born June 5, 2007) is an American professional stock car racing driver. He competes full-time in the ARCA Menards Series East and West, driving the No. 41 Ford Fusion for Lowden Jackson Motorsports, and part-time in the ARCA Menards Series, driving the No. 41 Ford Fusion for the same team.

Racing career

Late models 
In 2020, Reif made his debut in late models, running two races. He finished 7th and 5th in each race. That same year, Reif would also run some legends car races, winning in his first start at Meridian Speedway. In 2021, he would join the SRL Southwest Tour, driving for his family owned team, Reif Racing. He ended the season with seven top fives, nine top tens, and ranked 5th in the final standings. He returned for a full-time season in 2022, earning six top fives and nine top tens, finishing 3rd in the standings.

ARCA Menards Series West 
On October 10, 2022, it was announced that Reif would make his ARCA Menards Series West debut with Lowden Motorsports at Las Vegas Motor Speedway Bullring. He would start 17th and finish 18th. He made his second start of the year in the season finale at Phoenix Raceway. After starting 24th, he would finish in 12th. On December 12, 2022, it was announced that Reif would be promoted to a full-time schedule with the newly renamed Lowden Jackson Motorsports in the 2023 season. In his first start of the season, Reif scored his first career ARCA Menards Series win, after passing Landen Lewis for the lead on the final lap.

ARCA Menards Series East 
On February 24, 2023, along with running full-time in the West Series, Reif announced that he will also be running full-time in the ARCA Menards Series East for the 2023 season, competing for two championships in both series with Lowden Jackson Motorsports.

ARCA Menards Series 
In 2023, Reif made his ARCA Menards Series debut in the second race of the season at Phoenix Raceway, which was a combination race with the West Series. Reif would score his first career ARCA win, after passing Landen Lewis for the lead on the final lap.

Personal life 
Tyler's older brother, Tanner Reif, also competes full-time in the ARCA Menards Series West, driving for Bill McAnally Racing.

Motorsports career results

ARCA Menards Series 
(key) (Bold – Pole position awarded by qualifying time. Italics – Pole position earned by points standings or practice time. * – Most laps led. ** – All laps led.)

ARCA Menards Series East

ARCA Menards Series West

References

External links 

Living people
2007 births
ARCA Menards Series drivers
NASCAR drivers
Racing drivers from Nevada
Sportspeople from Nevada